Eastern leatherwood is a common name for several plants and may refer to:

 Eucryphia moorei, a tree native to Australia
 Dirca palustris, a shrub native to North America